Gephyrean may refer to:

 Gephyrea, an obsolete class of marine worms
 Gephyreans, Gephyraeans or Gephyraei, a clan or lineage established in Boeotia in antiquity; see

See also
 Gephyra